is a passenger railway station located in the city of Matsuyama, Ehime Prefecture, Japan. It is operated by JR Shikoku and has the station number "Y46".

Lines
The Okayama service is known as the Shiokaze and the Takamatsu service is known as the Ishizuchi (the name of the highest mountain on Shikoku). There are some through trains from Okayama and Takamatsu to Uwajima that stop at Matsuyama.

Layout
Matsuyama Station has one side platform serving one track (No. 1) and is directly connected to the station building and an island platform serving two tracks (Nos. 2 and 3). The two platforms are connected by an footbridge. The station has a Midori no Madoguchi staffed ticket office.

History
By opening of Matsuyama Station, all prefectural capitals but Naha were connected by the government railways. The name Matsuyama Station was previously used by the terminal of Iyo Railway, which was renamed Matsuyama City Station in March 1927. In 2014, a proposed elevated station was proposed, which would eliminate several rail-road crossings. Conceptual drawings are currently on display at the entrance of the station; however as of 2019, construction has yet to begin.

Surrounding area
Iyo Railway has a tram stop named Matsuyama Ekimae in front of the station.
Matsuyama Chamber of Commerce and Industry
Matsuyama District Government Building
Matsuyama District Legal Affairs Bureau

See also
 List of railway stations in Japan

References

External links
 Official home page

Yosan Line
Railway stations in Ehime Prefecture
Railway stations in Japan opened in 1927
Railway stations in Matsuyama, Ehime